Dane William DeHaan (born February 6, 1986) is an American actor known for his roles as Andrew Detmer in Chronicle (2012), Jason Glanton in The Place Beyond the Pines (2012), Lucien Carr in Kill Your Darlings (2013), Harry Osborn / Green Goblin in The Amazing Spider-Man 2 (2014), Lockhart in A Cure for Wellness (2016), Valerian in Valerian and the City of a Thousand Planets (2017), and Chris Lynwood in ZeroZeroZero. In 2021, he starred in psychological romance horror miniseries Lisey's Story. He also had a role in the true crime limited series adaptation of The Staircase in 2022.

Early life
DeHaan was born in Allentown, Pennsylvania. His father is a computer programmer and his mother is an executive at MetLife. He has an older sister, and had what The Independent described in 2017 as a "very normal, super-supportive childhood".

DeHaan attended Emmaus High School in Emmaus, Pennsylvania for three years and appeared in community theater. He switched to the University of North Carolina School of the Arts for his senior year of high school, where he was "around artists for the first time". He continued at UNCSA for undergraduate studies, graduating in 2008.

Career

DeHaan began his professional acting career as an understudy for Haley Joel Osment in the short-lived 2008 Broadway revival of American Buffalo. Also in 2008, he made his television debut, guest-appearing on an episode of Law & Order: Special Victims Unit. 

In 2010, DeHaan made his feature film debut in John Sayles' Amigo. Also in 2010, he played Jesse in the third season of HBO's In Treatment. In 2011, he played Timbo in the fourth season of True Blood. In 2012, DeHaan starred in the sci-fi found footage film Chronicle and as Cricket in Lawless. 

In 2013, he played Lucien Carr (a contemporary of Allen Ginsberg and Jack Kerouac) in Kill Your Darlings. It was a role for which he has received critical acclaim. In 2013, he starred as the main character "Trip" in Metallica's surrealist concert film Metallica: Through the Never. He was the cover star of Hero magazine issue 10 in October 2013, shot by Hedi Slimane. 

In 2014, Annie Leibovitz photographed DeHaan for Prada's men's clothing spring advertising campaign. That same year, he played Harry Osborn / Green Goblin in The Amazing Spider-Man 2 and Zach Orfman in Life After Beth. DeHaan played a fictional version of himself in the music video for Imagine Dragons' song "I Bet My Life".

In 2015, DeHaan starred as James Dean in the drama Life, based on Dean's friendship with photographer Dennis Stock. In September 2015, DeHaan was the cover star of Another Man issue 20. In 2016, DeHaan played Roman in the independent drama film Two Lovers and a Bear and Lockhart in the 2016 horror film A Cure for Wellness.

In 2017, DeHaan starred in Luc Besson's science fiction film Valerian and the City of a Thousand Planets based on the French comics series Valérian and Laureline. He also starred in the 17th-century romance Tulip Fever.

In 2019, DeHaan starred as Billy the Kid in Vincent D'Onofrio's The Kid.

From 2019 to 2020, DeHaan starred as Chris Lynwood in the Amazon Prime series ZeroZeroZero. He starred in the Quibi mini-series The Stranger in 2020.

In February 2022, DeHaan was cast in an undisclosed role in Christopher Nolan’s upcoming biographical film Oppenheimer.

Personal life
DeHaan married American actress Anna Wood in a private ceremony on June 30, 2012. The two met in high school in North Carolina and have been together since 2006. They both appeared in Chronicle (2012). They live in the Williamsburg neighborhood of Brooklyn in New York City and have a daughter, Bowie Rose, born in 2017, and a son, Bert Apollo, born in 2020.

Filmography

Film

Television

Music videos

Awards and nominations

Film

Theater

References

Sources

External links 

 
 

1986 births
Living people
21st-century American male actors
American male film actors
American male stage actors
American male television actors
Emmaus High School alumni
Male actors from Allentown, Pennsylvania
People from Williamsburg, Brooklyn
University of North Carolina School of the Arts alumni